Mycoplana dimorpha is a gram-negative bacteria from the genus of Mycoplana.

References

External links
Type strain of Mycoplana dimorpha at BacDive -  the Bacterial Diversity Metadatabase

Rhizobiaceae
Bacteria described in 1928